Michel Degand (15 November 1934 – 19 October 2021) was a French painter, sculptor, cartoonist, and graphic artist.

Biography
During his youth, Degand's grandfather, an art glazier and orchestra conductor, taught him music and drawing and made him choose a profession in lithography taught at the Collège technique Baggio de Lille. For his compulsory military service, he was sent to Paris to serve in the French Navy. While in Paris, he attended the Académie de la Grande Chaumière before returning to Lille and learning tapestry. He also produced tapestries for the Gobelins Manufactory. He stayed in the United States and held exhibitions at the Wenger Studio in San Francisco and the Carlson Tower Gallery in Chicago. In 1979, a retrospective of his works was held at the Palais des Beaux-Arts de Lille. Another retrospective was held in 2013 at the Musée des beaux-arts d'Arras.

On 4 October 2019, the city of Loos opened the Espace Michel Degand, a permanent exhibition in dedication to the artist. In 2013, the poet Pierre Henry wrote a biography on him, titled Michel Degand ou l'art du poétique.

Michel Degand died in Tourcoing on 19 October 2021 at the age of 86.

Main works

Tapestries
D'étoiles dans les soirs tremblants (1967)
En cet espace inexploré du rêve (1970)
Le chant vers l'impossible (1974)
Ni jour ni nuit (1982)
Les Visages oubliés (1985)
Envers l'avenir (1998)
Vers un autre demain (2004)
Miroir de Terre (2007)

Paintings
La Vieille Fille (1977)
Palimpseste (2003)
Le Zéro à l'infini... ou mille et un chuchotements (2009)
Apprends moi à passer (2011)
Ne pas aller au-delà (2011)

Sculptures
Bois peint (1995)
La Famille (2005)
Terre de ciel (2010)

Retrospectives
Tapisseries, Midaforms, Dessins (1979)
Peintures (2014)
Tapisseries (2014)
Tapisserie d'Aubusson (2019)

Books
Trames (1972)
Répétition privée (1997)
Elles et Eux (1998)
Le Feu sacré, les peintres du Nord (2004)
Scribere (2004)
Ciel de lies (2005)
L'Œil Bleu d'Henri Matisse (2006)
Traverses (2008)
Le Zéro à l'infini... ou « mille et un chuchotements » (2009)
Roncq, Terre de Ciel (2010)
Un arbre pour les mouettes (2010)

Bibliography
Degand (1969)
Michel Degand (1972)
Michel Degand (Hervé Oursel & Annie Scottez, 1979)
Michel Degand (Georges Goldine, 1981)
Degand (Françoise Poiret & Gérard Durozoi & Alain Réveillon, 1995)
Moments d'atelier (2001)
L'œuvre textile (Alin Avila, 2010)
Tapisseries 2013 Musée des Beaux-Arts d'Arras - Peintures 2013 Cité Nature d'Arras (Annie Esnault, 2013)
Michel Degand ou l'art du poétique : Biographie par Pierre Henry (Pierre Henry, 2013)

References

1934 births
2021 deaths
20th-century French painters
French sculptors
French cartoonists
People from Nord (French department)
21st-century French painters